Sioux Lookout is a town in Northwestern Ontario, Canada. Known locally as the "Hub of the North", it is serviced by the Sioux Lookout Airport, Highway 72, and the Sioux Lookout railway station. According to a 2011 study commissioned by the municipality, health care and social services ranked as the largest sources of employment, followed by the retail trade, public administration, transportation and warehousing, manufacturing, accommodation and food services, and education.

Sioux Lookout is also a key airport hub for numerous northern and Indigenous communities in Northwestern Ontario and remains a service stop for Via Rail's Canadian train and a busy railway junction for the northwestern Ontario segment of Canadian National Railway's transcontinental Class 1 railroad.

Fishing camps in the area allow access to an extensive lake system fed by the English River. The town is surrounded by several beaches, including Umphreville Park, a historical site that predates the town itself. During the summer months, Sioux Lookout's population rises as tourists, mostly American, arrive to take advantage of the multitude of lakes and rivers in the area. Experienced guides, employed by the camps, can locate the best locations and also provide an educated tour of the unique land known affectionately as "sunset country".

Communities

In addition to the town of Sioux Lookout itself, the municipal boundaries include the community of Hudson and the railway point Pelican, located west on the Canadian National Railway (CNR) transcontinental main line; the railway point Superior Junction located on the CNR transcontinental main line to the east; and the railway point Alcona, located on a CNR branch line to the south east and south of Superior Junction.

History 

Sioux Lookout's name comes from a local mountain and First Nations story. This mountain, known as Sioux Mountain, was used in the late 18th century by the Ojibwe to watch for any oncoming Sioux warriors looking to ambush their camp. A careful eye could see the sun shining off the birch of enemy canoes crossing nearby rapids. Women and children could be led away safely while the warriors could intercept the Sioux on the water. Illustrating this old story on the front page of the local newspaper, The Sioux Lookout Bulletin, features an iconic image of a First Nations man, holding a hand above his eyes to scan the waters.

Present-day Sioux Lookout was incorporated in 1912 and was then a terminal and junction on the National Transcontinental Railway. For many years, Sioux Lookout was simply a railway town. When gold was discovered in Red Lake, it became one of the leading aviation centers in Canada during the twenties and thirties. During the Cold War, Sioux Lookout operated a radar base to monitor any activity from the Soviet Union. Now, the Canadian National Railway is a significant employer, but it and the forest products industry are no longer the largest sectors of the municipality’s diversified economy. Instead, as a service centre for numerous northern First Nations communities, health-care, human and social services, education, and the provincial and federal government are major sources of Sioux Lookout employment. As a result, Sioux Lookout barely felt the effects of the recession in the early 1980s. The permanent closure of the lumber mill in Hudson, around the time of the global financial crisis and recession in 2008-09, and hospital expansion, construction of a new, larger complex for the Meno Ya Win Health Centre, shortly thereafter, however, contributed to significant employment changes and demographic shifts. Urban Sioux Lookout fronts on Pelican Lake, and the municipality undertook a lakefront improvement program to beautify this area. There are now more parks, paths, and other recreational facilities along the lakefront. Numerous other lakes are easily accessible by car or boat from Sioux Lookout. Tourism makes a significant contribution to the local economy, however, there is far more capacity for development and its potential is starting to be recognized.

Geography and climate
The boundaries of Sioux Lookout were significantly expanded on January 1, 1998 to include a number of unorganized geographic townships surrounding the town itself.

Climate
Sioux Lookout experiences a humid continental climate (Dfb) with long, cold winters and short, warm summers.

Demographics 

As an ethnically diverse community, Sioux Lookout has a large Indigenous population (1,955 people) along with a smaller number of individuals from all over the world. The average household size is 2.6 persons. The median household income in 2015 for Sioux Lookout was $85,146, above the Ontario provincial average of $74,287. The average age in Sioux Lookout is 37.1 years old.

Population trend:
 Population in 2016: 5272
 Population in 2011: 5037
 Population in 2006: 5183
 Population in 2001: 5336
 Population in 1996: 3469 (or 5165 when adjusted to 2001 boundaries)
 Population in 1991: 3311

Government

Sioux Lookout elects one mayor, six "councillors-at-large". Mayor Doug Lawrance leads a council of Joe Cassidy, Cory Lago, Joyce Timpson, Joan Cosco, Luc Beaulne, Reece Van Breda.

The town is represented in the House of Commons of Canada by Conservative MP Eric Melillo in the electoral district of Kenora, and in the Legislative Assembly of Ontario by NDP MPP Sol Mamakwa in the electoral district of Kiiwetinoong.

The Sioux Lookout OPP detachment, according to the Sioux Lookout municipal government website, is composed of 44 Constables, seven First Nation constables, five Special Constables, six Sergeants, one Staff Sergeant, one Inspector, eight civilian employees and 62 part-time guards and matrons.

Economy

The main industries of Sioux Lookout are:

 Services (68%)
 Forestry (14%)
 Transportation (12%)
 Tourism (4%)

The population explodes during the spring and summer months when seasonal residents arrive. Most of Sioux Lookout's tourism comes from people wanting to experience outdoor activities. Fishing is the main tourist attraction during the summer months due to the access to numerous lakes, such as Lac Seul and Minnitaki Lake.

Education

Confederation College
While Confederation College is based in Thunder Bay, it operates several campuses across northwestern Ontario, which include a campus in Sioux Lookout within the site of Sioux North High School. The college offers various programs for students wishing to continue their post-secondary education. Nursing, Business, Social Service, and Mechanical Techniques are just some of the programs available at the Sioux Lookout campus.

Secondary education

Keewatin-Patricia District School Board's Sioux North High School, located at 86 3rd Avenue provides secondary education to Sioux Lookout residents as well as to many students from remote northern First Nations communities. It replaced Queen Elizabeth District High School in 2019. It is the only high school (public or Catholic) within Sioux Lookout.

Elementary and other education centres

Sioux Lookout has two major elementary schools: Sioux Mountain Public School of the Keewatin-Patricia District School Board and Sacred Heart School of the Northwest Catholic District School Board.

Other schools in the area include Cornerstone Christian Academy and Pelican Falls First Nations High School.

Hudson Public School in Hudson, Ontario was closed in 2011 by the Keewatin-Patricia District School Board and now used as Lac Seul Centre of Training Excellence. The closest elementary school near Hudson is Obishkokaang Elementary School on the north side of Lost Lake and serves students from the Lac Seul First Nations. Public school students in Hudson now must travel to Sioux Lookout.

Culture

Blueberry Festival

Sioux Lookout's annual Blueberry Festival has been held the first week of August since 1983. 2022 marks the 40th anniversary of the festival, which celebrates the town and its surrounding environment. The festival includes a number of sporting events (slo-pitch, beach volleyball, bocce, tennis, and golf tournaments) along with charitable fundraisers, blueberry themed food, historical walks, musical performances, a car & truck show, a farmers' market, and much more. The town mascot and face of the festival, Blueberry Bert, makes frequent appearances around town throughout the duration of the festival.

Outdoor activities
Hunting and fishing are popular pastimes in Sioux Lookout. The annual Walleye Weekend Tournament, organized by the Sioux Lookout Anglers and Hunters Group, is held the second weekend of June with several cash prizes available to be won. Numerous hunting and fishing camps, as well as fly-in fishing lodges, also operate in the area. These include: Anderson's Lodge, Frog Rapids Camp, Fireside Lodge, and Moosehorn Lodge among many others.

Ecotourism is growing rapidly with outfitters such as Goldwater Expeditions providing kayak, ski, and snowshoe rentals while also providing ecology based adventures, cultural education, and ecological interpretation.

Sites of interest
 Sioux Mountain
 Cedar Bay Recreational Facilities
Ojibway Provincial Park

Arts

Literature
Peggy Sanders, awarded the Order of Canada in October 2006, is Sioux Lookout's leading literary figure. She was praised by the Governor-General for "bridging cultures...and building relationships between Aboriginal and non-Aboriginal communities for decades". She continued to note that Sanders was: "a founding member of the local anti-racism committee...and has championed literacy by founding the town's first public library." Patricia Ningewance Nadeau, from Lac Seul, Ontario, is on the board of directors at the Indigenous Language Institute. She has published a textbook on language: Talking Gookom's Language and five other books. She was the first editor of Wawatay News in Sioux Lookout.

Richard Schwindt, former resident of Sioux Lookout, published a collection of short stories titled Dreams and Sioux Nights in 2003. Most of the characters and settings are based upon Sioux Lookout and the surrounding area.

Phillip Neault-Pioneer is the collection of songs and stories told by Mae Carroll to her grandchildren. Her book, edited by James R. Stevens, takes place in the two railroad towns of Fort William and Sioux Lookout in pioneer times.

The Sioux Lookout Anti-Racism Committee was a winner of the 23rd Annual Human Rights Media Awards, presented by the League for Human Rights of B'nai B'rith Canada, for "their web site which deals with the effects and strategies of dealing with issues of racism and resources and strategies to deal with instances of racism".

The town also appears as a prominent figure in the novel, The Cunning Man by Robertson Davies.

Sioux Lookout is also a feature in Paulette Jiles' novel North Spirit: Travels Among the Cree and Ojibway Nations and Their Star Maps published in 1995 by Doubleday Canada Limited.

Music

Lawrence Martin, a Juno Award-winning musician, was the mayor of Sioux Lookout during the 1990s. Martin is now mayor of Cochrane, and was once a member of the TVOntario board of directors. Also, a concert series called S.L.Y.M (Sioux Lookout Youth Music) Productions supplies the town with local and out-of- town bands for the town's ear drums. To date, S.L.Y.M has featured the local bands of Darkness Deprived, Red Radio, Double Helix, and The Four Ohms. S.L.Y.M. also regularly hosts open coffee houses to showcase local acoustic talent.  The Sioux Lookout Cultural Centre for Youth and the Arts is under construction and will include a recording studio for aspiring local artists.

Sports

Sioux Lookout was home to the Sioux Lookout Flyers, a Junior A team in the Superior International Junior Hockey League, which folded in 2012. Also hosted every year is a First Nations hockey tournament.

Ryan Parent, first round NHL draft pick and two-time World Junior Hockey champion, was raised in Sioux Lookout. Parent returns to his home town during the off-season. As a member of the Canadian World Juniors team, Parent won two consecutive gold medals in 2006 and 2007. He was a first-round draft pick (18th overall) of the Nashville Predators in the 2005 NHL entry draft and was traded to the Philadelphia Flyers on February 17, 2007. Ryan Parent officially joined the NHL when he was recalled from the Flyer's AHL affiliate team the Philadelphia Phantoms on February 13, 2008 and took a place on the roster.

Infrastructure

New residential zones have been created in response to Sioux Lookout's continued population growth (which is one of the highest rates in Northern Ontario). In the past decade, Sioux Lookout has renovated its train station and built several new buildings including a new elementary school, a new high school, grocery store, youth centre, court house, hospital, and clinic.

Health and medicine

The new Sioux Lookout Meno-Ya-Win Health Centre opened its doors to patients in late 2010. The  hospital has brought many health care services together under one roof. The building complex provides Sioux Lookout, as well as 29 northern communities, with healthcare services. The catchment area for the health centre covers an area larger than France. The health centre—including a hospital, long term care facility, and community services—is characterized by its unique blending of mainstream and traditional Indigenous care. It has been designated as Ontario's centre of excellence for First Nations' healthcare.

Transportation
Sioux Lookout Airport was opened in 1933; at the time it was the second busiest airport in North America next to Chicago. Today, the airport is a mini-hub facilitating travel to and from all northern communities in Northwestern Ontario. Ornge, Ontario's air ambulance service, operates a base at the airport. Bearskin Airlines, SkyCare Air Ambulance, Slate Falls Airways, Bamaji Air Service, Perimeter Aviation and Wasaya Airways all operate out of the airport.

Media

Newspaper
 Sioux Lookout Bulletin

=Radio
 FM 89.9 - CKWT-FM, Wawatay Radio Network, First Nations community
 FM 91.9 - CIDE-FM, Wawatay Radio Network, First Nations community
 FM 95.3 - CBLS-FM, CBC Radio One (rebroadcaster of CBQT-FM Thunder Bay)
 FM 97.1 - CKDR-FM-2, adult contemporary (rebroadcaster of CKDR-FM Dryden)
 FM 104.5 - CKQV-FM-3, Hot AC/CHR (rebroadcaster of CKQV-FM Vermilion Bay)

References

Notes

External links

 
Hudson's Bay Company trading posts
Single-tier municipalities in Ontario